Cerulean is the debut studio album by American electronic musician Baths. It was released on June 22, 2010 by Anticon.

Critical reception

The album received generally favorable reviews from critics. The lead single "Maximalist" was premiered by Earmilk and later featured on Pitchfork. Later in 2010, Pitchfork gave Cerulean an "Honorable Mention" in their countdown of the best albums of 2010. The album was also named by The A.V. Club as the 21st best album of 2010.

Track listing

Personnel
Credits adapted from AllMusic website.

Musicians
 Will Wiesenfield – performer
 Mario Luna – guitar, vocals 

Technical personnel
 Daddy Kev – mastering

Artwork
 Jesselisa Moretti – artwork, design

References

External links
 

2010 debut albums
Anticon albums
Baths (musician) albums